Gyda Ellefsplass Olssen (born November 16, 1978 in Elverum) is a Norwegian sport shooter. At age twenty-nine, Olssen made her official debut for the 2008 Summer Olympics in Beijing, where she competed in two rifle shooting events. She placed thirty-fourth out of forty-seven shooters in the women's 10 m air rifle, with a total score of 391 points. Nearly a week later, Olssen competed for her second event, 50 m rifle 3 positions, where she was able to shoot 195 targets in a prone position, and 190 each in standing and in kneeling, for a total score of 575 points, finishing only in twenty-seventh place.

References

External links
NBC 2008 Olympics profile

Norwegian female sport shooters
Living people
Olympic shooters of Norway
Shooters at the 2008 Summer Olympics
People from Elverum
1978 births
Sportspeople from Innlandet
21st-century Norwegian women